The 2000 NatWest Trophy was the 20th and last NatWest Trophy before being renamed as the Cheltenham & Gloucester Trophy for the 2001 season.  It was an English limited overs county cricket tournament which was held between 2 May and 26 August 2000. The tournament was won by Gloucestershire who defeated Warwickshire by 22 runs in the final at Lord's.

Format
The 18 first-class counties, were joined by all twenty Minor Counties, plus Huntingdonshire.  They were also joined by the cricket boards of Derbyshire, Durham, Essex, Gloucestershire, Hampshire, Kent, Lancashire, Leicestershire, Middlesex, Northamptonshire, Nottinghamshire, Somerset, Surrey, Sussex, Warwickshire, Worcestershire and Yorkshire.  The national teams of Denmark, Ireland, the Netherlands and Scotland once again took part in the tournament.

The tournament was a knockout with four rounds before the quarter-final and semi-final stages. The winners of the semi-finals went on to the final at Lord's which was held on 26 August 2000.

First round

Second round

Third round

Fourth round

Quarter-finals

Semi-finals

Final

 This was the first domestic English one-day final to be concluded by the use of the Duckworth–Lewis method

References

External links
CricketArchive tournament page 

Friends Provident Trophy seasons
Natwest Trophy, 2000
NatWest Group